Lê Trang Tông (1515 – 9 March 1548) was the 13th emperor of the Later Lê dynasty and the first of the Revival Lê dynasty. His enthronement marked the re-establishment of the Later Lê dynasty following a six-year hiatus.

Biography

Lê Trang Tông was born in 1515 at Đông Kinh with real name Lê Ninh (黎寧). In 1527 general Mạc Đăng Dung overthrew the Lê emperor and established the Mạc dynasty, Lê Ninh and his royal family ran to Trấn Ninh and later hid deep inside Laos for 6 years. In 1533, a loyalist to Lê dynasty name Nguyễn Kim rebelled against the Mạc dynasty, sent troops to Laos and brought Lê Ninh back to the throne, reign name Nguyên Hòa (元和), set capital in the city of Tây Kinh, marked the period Southern and Northern Dynasties (Vietnam) from 1533 to 1592. In early 1548, Lê Ninh suffered fatal sick and died. His son Lê Huyên succeed the throne while Trịnh and Nguyễn clans steady took most of powers of the court.

References

1515 births
1548 deaths
T
Vietnamese monarchs
Founding monarchs